
Gmina Sterdyń is a rural gmina (administrative district) in Sokołów County, Masovian Voivodeship, in east-central Poland. Its seat is the village of Sterdyń, which lies approximately 19 kilometres (12 mi) north of Sokołów Podlaski and 95 km (59 mi) north-east of Warsaw.

Villages
Gmina Sterdyń contains the villages and settlements of Białobrzegi, Borki, Chądzyń, Dąbrówka, Dzięcioły Bliższe, Dzięcioły Dalsze, Dzięcioły-Kolonia, Golanki, Grądy, Granie, Kamieńczyk, Kiełpiniec, Kiezie, Kolonia Dzięcioły Dalsze, Kolonia Kamieńczykowska, Kolonia Kuczaby, Kolonia Paderewek, Kolonia Stary Ratyniec, Kuczaby, Łazów, Łazówek, Lebiedzie, Lebiedzie-Kolonia, Matejki, Nowe Mursy, Nowy Ratyniec, Paderew, Paderewek, Paulinów, Seroczyn, Seroczyn-Kolonia, Sewerynówka, Stare Mursy, Stary Ratyniec, Stelągi, Stelągi-Kolonia, Sterdyń, Szwejki and Zaleś.

Neighbouring gminas
Gmina Sterdyń is bordered by the gminas of Ceranów, Ciechanowiec, Jabłonna Lacka, Kosów Lacki, Nur, Sabnie and Sokołów Podlaski.

References

Polish official population figures 2006

Sterdyn
Sokołów County